Stanhope Gardens is a suburb of Greater Western Sydney, in the state of New South Wales, Australia. Stanhope Gardens is located 31 kilometres north-west of the Sydney central business district in the local government area of City of Blacktown.

History
John Hillas (1768–1837) arrived in Australia in 1801 and received two land grants (in 1801 and 1804) on the Windsor Road. The second of these, of 150 acres, he named "Stanhope Farm".  He established an inn, the Stanhope Arms on Windsor Road, to cater for the traffic between the Macquarie Towns and Parramatta.

By 1856 the Pearce family owned Stanhope Farm. In 1928 Jack Peel bought Stanhope Farm and called it Stanhope Park Dairy.

In 1973 the New South Wales Housing Commission compulsorily resumed Stanhope Park Dairy.

The suburb name reflects these early properties. Stanhope Gardens Estate opened in 1995 and was recognised as a suburb in 1996.

When Stanhope Gardens was first being developed into what it is today, it was called Irish Town, Kellyville and Parklea. A petition was sent around with most people voting to keep Stanhope in the name, becoming Stanhope Gardens.

Newbury Estate – a master-planned estate – now occupies a large part of the suburb of Stanhope Gardens, planned by Landcom in 1999 and majority built by Mirvac. Newbury estate compromise of 1,761 properties, subdivided into seven community title subdivisions, each with its community facility including a clubhouse, tennis court, pool, spa and BBQ area.

Population
In the 2016 Census, there were 9,163 people in Stanhope Gardens. 53.9% of people were born in Australia. The next most common countries of birth were India 9.2%, Philippines 6.0%, England 2.5%, China 2.4% and New Zealand 1.9%.

55.6% of people spoke only English at home. Other languages spoken at home included Hindi 5.5%, Tagalog 3.2%, Mandarin 2.9%, Punjabi 2.6% and Filipino 2.0%. The most common responses for religion were Catholic 27.6%, No Religion 16.5%, Hinduism 11.8% and Anglican 10.9%.

Commercial area
Stanhope Village is a sub-regional shopping centre anchored by a Coles supermarket and Liquorland, Kmart, ALDI supermarket and 40 other specialised retail, service, fashion and food outlets. In March 2015 a redevelopment and extension of the centre was opened.

Education 
Schools located in Stanhope Gardens includes:

 John XXIII Catholic Primary School (Catholic Primary School, 160 Perfection Ave, Stanhope Gardens NSW 2768).
 St Mark's Catholic College (Catholic High School, 160 Perfection Ave, Stanhope Gardens NSW 2768).
Stanhope Gardens has the following public school catchment:

 John Palmer Public School (Public Primary School, The Ponds).
 Kellyville Ridge Public School (Public Primary School, Kellyville Ridge).
 Parklea Public School (Public Primary School, Glenwood).
 Glenwood High School (Public High School, Glenwood).
 The Ponds High School (Public High School, The Ponds).
 Rouse Hill High School (Public High School, Rouse Hill).

Transport
Public transport is provided by private bus operators Hillsbus (route 6xx) and Busways (route 7xx), under contract from Transport for NSW. Services are available to Sydney CBD, Parramatta, Rouse Hill, Blacktown, Castle Hill, Pennant Hills and Epping.

The suburb is served by Stanhope Station on the Blacktown-Parklea branch of the North-West T-way. It is also close to Kellyville station on the Sydney Metro Northwest, and is connected by bus routes 603, 632 and 735

Eastbound bus services that serve Stanhope Gardens are:

From Stanhope T-way
Route 735 to Blacktown via T-way

From Stanhope Village
Route 616X to City QVB via Glenwood (weekday mornings only)
Route 663 to Parramatta via Glenwood
Route 745 to Bella Vista via Glenwood
Route 731 to Blacktown via Acacia Gardens
Route 734 to Blacktown

From Perfection Ave
 Route 603 to Parramatta via Kellyville station and Castle Hill
 Route 632 to Pennant Hills via Kellyville Station and Norwest Station

In the westbound direction:

From Stanhope T-way
Route 735 to Rouse Hill

From Stanhope Village
Route 616X to Kellyville Ridge (weekday afternoons only)
Route 663 to Rouse Hill Station via Kellyville Ridge
Route 745 to St Marys via Quakers Hill and Plumpton
Route 731 to Rouse Hill Station
Route 734 to Riverstone via The Ponds

From Perfection Ave
 Route 603 to Rouse Hill Station via Kellyville Ridge
 Route 632 to Rouse Hill Station via Kellyville Ridge

Sport and recreation

Blacktown Leisure Centre Stanhope is a fitness and swimming centre with a wave pool and library. Located opposite the shopping centre, it is operated by the Blacktown City Council. It hosted the 2016 Women's Oceania Handball Championship in October 2016.

Places of worship

Stanhope Anglican Church meets in the function room of Blacktown Leisure Centre Stanhope on Sunday mornings.
The Catholic Parish of Blessed John XXIII holds services in the Church on Perfection Avenue, Stanhope Gardens. Attached to the Church is John 23rd Catholic Primary School (pre-school to Year 6), and St Marks Catholic Secondary College (years 7–12).

Politics
The suburb is in the Electoral district of Riverstone for the state of New South Wales. At Federal level, the suburb is located in the Division of Greenway.

References

Suburbs of Sydney
City of Blacktown
Populated places established in 1996
1996 establishments in Australia